Thomas Frame (5 September 1902 – 17 January 1986) was a Scottish professional football centre half who made over 160 appearances in the Scottish League for Cowdenbeath. He also played in the Football League for Manchester United and Southport.

Career statistics

Honours

Cowdenbeath Hall of Fame

References

External links
MUFCInfo.com profile

1902 births
1986 deaths
Scottish footballers
Burnbank Athletic F.C. players
Cowdenbeath F.C. players
Manchester United F.C. players
Southport F.C. players
Rhyl F.C. players
Bridgnorth Town F.C. players
Scottish Junior Football Association players
Footballers from Hamilton, South Lanarkshire
Babcock & Wilcox F.C. players
Scottish expatriate footballers
Expatriate soccer players in the United States
Scottish expatriate sportspeople in the United States
Association football central defenders